The O'Day 25 is an American trailerable sailboat that was designed by C.R. Hunt & Associates.

Production
The boat was built by O'Day Corp. in the United States, with 2,898 completed between 1975 and 1984, when production ended. It was one of the company's most successful designs.

Design

The O'Day 25 is a small recreational keelboat, built predominantly of fiberglass, with wood trim. It has a masthead sloop rig, a transom-hung rudder and a fixed fin keel or centerboard. It displaces  and carries  of ballast.

The boat is usually fitted with a small  outboard motor, but a  Universal Atomic 4 and later a Japanese Yanmar diesel engine were available factory options.

Variants
O'Day 25
O'Day 25 CB
The majority of the production run was CB models.
O'Day 25 CB TM

Operational history
In a 2010 review Steve Henkel wrote, "the O'Day 25 ... came in two variations: the keel-centerboarder ... and a deep fin keel version with 4' 6" draft, 20 square feet more sail area, two-foot higher mast, and 50 pounds less ballast. Outboard power on a stern bracket (or a small Atomic 2 gasoline engine of 7 hp) was the choice at one point; then diesels came in. Production of both types of O'Day 25s together totaled over 2,800 between 1975 and 1983, right at the peak of the Golden Age of sailboat sales in this size range. Best features: Here is a nice-looking, good (though not superb) quality boat, with plenty of owners with whom to fraternize if you like to socialize ... Worst features: The galley seems a bit skimpy to us ..."

See also
List of sailing boat types

Similar sailboats
Beachcomber 25
Bayfield 25
Beneteau First 25.7
Beneteau First 25S
Beneteau First 260 Spirit
Bombardier 7.6
Cal 25
Cal 2-25
C&C 25
Capri 25
Catalina 25
Catalina 250
Com-Pac 25
Dufour 1800
Freedom 25
Hunter 25.5
Jouët 760
Kelt 7.6
Kirby 25
MacGregor 25
Merit 25
Mirage 25
Northern 25
Redline 25
Sirius 26
Tanzer 25
US Yachts US 25
Watkins 25

References

External links

Keelboats
1970s sailboat type designs
Sailing yachts
Trailer sailers
Sailboat type designs by C. Raymond Hunt Associates
Sailboat types built by O'Day Corp.